Mykonos is a Greek island, part of the Cyclades, lying between Tinos, Syros, Paros and Naxos. There are 10,134 inhabitants according to the 2011 census, most of whom live in the largest town, Mykonos, which lies on the west coast. The town is also known as Chora (i.e. 'Town' in Greek, following the common practice in Greece when the name of the island itself is the same as the name of the principal town).

Mykonos's nickname is "The Island of the Winds", due to the very strong winds that usually blow on the island. Tourism is a major industry and Mykonos is known for its vibrant nightlife and for being a gay-friendly destination with many establishments catering for the LGBT community.

History
Herodotus mentions Carians as the original inhabitants of the island. Ionians from Athens seem to have followed next in the early 11th century BC. It was, however, during ancient times a rather poor island with limited agricultural resources. Its inhabitants were polytheists and worshiped many gods.

Mykonos came under the control of the Romans during the reign of the Roman Empire and then became part of the Byzantine Empire until the 12th century. In 1204, with the fall of Constantinople in the Fourth Crusade, Mykonos was occupied by Andrea Ghisi. The island was ravaged by the Catalans at the end of the 13th century and finally given over to direct Venetian rule in 1390.

In 1537, while the Venetians still reigned, Mykonos was attacked by Hayreddin Barbarossa, the admiral of Suleiman the Magnificent and an Ottoman fleet established itself on the island. The Ottomans, under the leadership of Kapudan Pasha, imposed a system of self-governance comprising a governor and an appointed council of syndics. When the castle of Tinos fell to the Ottomans in 1718, the last of the Venetians withdrew from the region.

Up until the end of the 18th century, Mykonos prospered as a trading center, attracting many immigrants from nearby islands, in addition to regular pirate raids. In June 1794 the Battle of Mykonos was fought between British and French ships in the island's main harbor.

The Greek Revolution against the Ottoman Empire broke out in 1821 and Mykonos played an important role, led by the national heroine, Manto Mavrogenous. Mavrogenous, a well-educated aristocrat guided by the ideas of the Enlightenment, sacrificed her family's fortune for the Greek cause. Greece became an independent state in 1830. A statue of her sits in the middle of Manto Mavrogenous square in the main town.

As a result of sailing and merchant activity, the island's economy quickly picked up but declined again during the late 19th century and especially after the opening of the Corinth Canal in 1904 and the First World War at the beginning of the 20th century. Many Mykonians left the island to find work in mainland Greece and many foreign countries, especially the United States.

Tourism soon came to dominate the local economy, owing a lot to the important excavations carried out by the French School of Archaeology, which began work in Delos in 1873. Mykonos became popular with international "jet set" tourists in the 1960s. In the 70s it was popular spot for Americans to treat as a nude beach, which Americans imagined to be a feature of those natural "far out" Greeks, and then flourished further to become a popular gay tourist destination in the 1980s. By the 2000s, Mykonos had become one of Greece's most expensive islands.

Mythology
In Greek mythology, Mykonos was named after its first ruler, Mykonos (Μύκονος), the son or grandson of the god Apollo and a local hero. The island is also said to have been the location of the Gigantomachy, the great battle between Zeus and Giants and where Hercules killed the invincible giants having lured them from the protection of Mount Olympus. According to myth, the large rocks all over the island are said to be the petrified corpses of the giants.

Geography

The island features no rivers, but numerous seasonal streams two of which have been converted into reservoirs.

The island is composed mostly of granite and the terrain is very rocky with many areas eroded by the strong winds. High quality clay and baryte, which is a mineral used as a lubricant in oil drilling, were mined on the eastern side of Mykonos until the late 1900s.

It produces  of water daily, by reverse osmosis of sea water in order to help meet the needs of its population and visitors.

The island has a population of nearly 12,500, most of whom live in the main town of Chora.

Climate
Mykonos has a hot semi-arid climate (Köppen;BSH) because of the low overall rainfall, although it has lots of Mediterranean characteristics and it is highly influenced by the Mediterranean Sea. The sun shines for up to 300 days a year. The rainy season lasts from October until March. Vegetation follows the typical pattern for the region and grows around mid-autumn and ends in the beginning of the summer.

Because of the seasonal cool "meltemi" wind (similar to the other Cyclades islands) and the moderating sea, summer days are relatively cool, dry, sunny and pleasant. The reason for the low overall rainfall is the rain shadow of the Pindus Mountains, which dry out the westerly winds. Winters in general are mild and wet, with many sunny days even in mid-winter. Snow is infrequent and doesn't stay long on the ground when it falls.

Villages
There are ten villages:

Cuisine

Local specialities:

Government

The municipality of Mykonos is a separate regional unit of the South Aegean region, and the sole municipality in the regional unit. As a part of the 2011 Kallikratis government reform, the regional unit Mykonos was created out of part of the former Cyclades Prefecture. The municipality, unchanged at the Kallikratis reform, also includes the islands Delos, Rineia and several uninhabited islets.

The mayors of Mykonos have been:
 1975-1978 Φραγκίσκος Νάζος (Fragiskos Nazos)
 1979-1990 Ματθαίος Αποστόλου (Matthaios Apostolou)
 1991-2010 Χρήστος Βερώνης (Christos Veronis)
 2011-2014 Αθανάσιος Κουσαθάνας-Μέγας (Athnanasios Kousathanas-Megas)
 2014- Κωνσταντίνος Κουκάς (Konstantinos Koukas)

Demographics
There are 10,134 inhabitants (2011) most of whom live in the largest town, Mykonos, also known as Chora (i.e. the Town in Greek, a common denomination in Greece when the name of the island itself is the same as the name of the principal town).

Economy
It being a Greek island, the economy of Mykonos is closely linked with the sea. However, with the rise of tourism, it plays a minor role during summer.

Landmarks

Municipal Library – an 18th-century mansion housing over 8,000 volumes and a vast collection of 18th- and 19th-century photographs, documents and Cycladic coins and old seals as well as sketches and books from the personal library of American artist John Ratekin. The Municipal Library is located on Ayia Kyriaki Square in the main town of Chora. 
Petros the Pelican – an old celebrity of the town's waterfront, "Petros" has been the official mascot of Mykonos for over 60 years. He took up permanent residence on the island after a storm in 1954 and after his death the islanders elected a successor to carry on his legacy until today. 
Mykonos windmills – The windmills are a defining feature of the Mykonian landscape. There are many dotted around the island, but most are concentrated in the main town of Chora. The famous "Kato Mili" in Chora (Greek for lower mills), stand in a row on a hill overlooking the sea to harness the strong northern winds. Capped with wood and straw, the windmills were built by the Venetians in the 16th century to mill flour and remained in use until the early 20th century. Many have been refurbished and restored to serve as homes to locals and vaults to numerous Mykonian heritage documents.

Little Venice – rows of fishing houses line the waterfront with their balconies hanging over the sea. The first of these was constructed in the mid-18th century. They originally belonged to rich merchants or captains and the little basement doors that provided direct access to the sea and underground storage areas led people to believe that the owners were secretly pirates. Some of the houses have now been converted into bars and cafes and little shops and galleries. Little Venice is considered one of the most romantic spots on the island and many people gather there to watch the sunset. The area attracts many artists who come to paint the picturesque coastline. 

Armenistis Lighthouse – is a testimony to Mykonos' maritime history, as well as a fully functioning lighthouse. It is located in Fanari, which means lantern in Greek,  from Chora. 
Tria Pigadia – are three identical wells standing in a row in the middle of the main town, Chora. They were built in 1722 to provide the town with water. Unlike most modern wells which are over 30 metres deep, the Tria Pigadia are only 5–6 metres deep as they were dug into sand where water was more easily accessible. 
Archaeological Museum of Mykonos – was built in 1905 to house the findings from the Purification Pit  of 425/426 BC, discovered in 1898 on the islet of Rheneia by D. Stavropoulos. It is one of the oldest museums in Greece and was designed by Alexandros Lykakis and funded by the Ministry of Education and the Archaeological Society of Athens. The land as donated by the Municipality of Mykonos.
The original Neoclassical building underwent refurbishments and expansions in the 1930s and 1960s and the large eastern room was added in 1972. The museum contains artefacts from the neighbouring island Rhenia, including 9th- to 8th-century BC ceramic pottery from the Cyclades and 7th- to 6th-century BC works from other areas in the Aegean. Its most famous item is the large vase produced in Tinos, showing scenes from the fall of Troy. 

Aegean Maritime Museum – was founded in 1983 by the Mykonian George M. Drakopoulos and it opened in 1985 with the goal of preserving and promoting the study of Greek maritime history and tradition, in particular the evolution and activities of the merchant ship in the Aegean Sea. Drakopoulos has been awarded with the Athens Academy Award and with the World Ship Trust's award for Individual Achievement for his work with the museum. The museum was the first in Greece that rescued and restored living historical exhibits to operate as they were originally designed and built. In addition to original pieces, there are also replicas of historical ships and collections of coins with nautical scenes from the 5th century BC to the 4th century AD and a variety of elaborate shipping instruments. 
Folklore Museum – the oldest house on the island houses a collection of 19th-century furniture, jewellery, ceramics embroideries, marble sculptures, tombstones and a variety of other trinkets. The museum also pays tribute to Mykonos' traditional nautical roots with models of 19th-century Mykonian ships, maps and an anchor and canons used during the Greek War of Independence. 
Lena's House – this 19th-century traditional Mykonian residence belonged to a wealthy shipping family and the original furniture is still preserved. The house now operates as a museum. 
Agricultural Museum (also known as the Bonis Mill) – old tools and machinery are displayed in one of Mykonos' windmills and, located above the main town of Chora in Ano Myloi (meaning Upper Windmills), it offers views of the area.
Paradise Beach – The most famous area to party in Mykonos.

Churches

There is an abundance of churches because, for many years, the islanders were required to build a church on their land before building a house.
Panagia Paraportiani - (the Church of Our Lady) one of the most famous architectural structures in Greece. The church received its name Paraportiani, which means "standing next to the entrance / door", because it was located next to the entrance of the ancient castle, or kastro door. The neighbourhood of Kastro, where it is situated, used to be the site of a medieval castle – in those days a castle was a strong fortification surrounding a settlement – constructed in 1207 by the Ghisi family, who controlled the island at the time. The castle was destroyed in the 16th century and its remnants covered up by new buildings when Chora began to expand in the 18th century. It took around 200 years to build the church. Construction began in the 15th century and was not completed until the 17th century. Its architectural quirkiness makes it one of the most photographed places in the world. 
Catholic Church - the only Catholic church on the island was constructed in 1668 and renovated in 1677 by Bishop Leandros Zanthakis. The icon of the Virgin Mary and baby Jesus between Saint Dominic and Saint Catherine of Siena was transported to Mykonos from Venice in 1715. A fire on 1 May 1991 damaged part of the church. By October 1997 the church was restored and re-opened to the public.

Transportation

The flight from Athens to Mykonos takes 25 minutes.

Mykonos is also accessible by boat and ferries. High speed vessels visit daily from the surrounding islands and from Athens.

Taxis, buses or boats are available for transportation. There are three main bus depots in Mykonos. The northern depot is situated behind Remezzo Club above the old Port and provides regular service to Ano Mera, Elia and Kalafatis. A few hundred meters below, at the Old Port, lays another Depot focusing on the northern destinations of Tourlos (New Port) and Agios Stefanos. The southern Bus Depot is at the town "entrance", called Fabrika and it provides regular service to Ornos, Agios Yannis, Plati Gialos, Psarou, Paraga, and Paradise Beach. Small boats travel to and from the many beaches. Tour boats go regularly to the nearby island of Delos.

Culture
In 2013 the Mykonos Biennale was inaugurated offering theatrical, cultural, cinematic, artistic, and musical productions.

Notable people

Manto Mavrogenous
Mary Paraskeva, early amateur photographer
Nicholas Pettas, professional martial artist, kickboxer, and actor
Ioannis Svoronos, archaeologist and numismatist
Ioannis Toumbas, naval officer

In popular culture
Mykonos is among several Greek islands mentioned in Kenneth Koch's poem "Sleeping with Women".
The official music video of Stereo Love (2009), by Edward Maya & Vika Jigulina was shot entirely in Mykonos and its surrounding areas.
Scenes of Mykonos are featured in the 2003 Indian movie Chalte Chalte.
 "Mykonos" is a song on the American folk-rock band Fleet Foxes' EP Sun Giant.
 The film Island of Death (1975), directed by Nico Mastorakis, was shot on the island of Mykonos. In 2015, Mastorakis returned to the island to revisit the locations.
 Apotos, the first stage of the video game Sonic Unleashed is heavily based upon the region.
 The final scene of the 2002 film The Bourne Identity plays out on Mykonos.
 Red Alert 3's Soviet campaign has a mission in Mykonos. The island is the location of a top-secret Allied weapons research laboratory that must be captured and defended from Allied attempts to retake the facility.
 The television show American Dad frequently references Mykonos, most notably Roger Smith in the episode "Bar Mitzvah Hustle."
 The game Assassin's Creed Odyssey features Mykonos during the Peloponnesian War.
 One of the stages of the video game Street Fighter Alpha 3 is set in Mykonos.

See also
Communities of the Cyclades 
Mykonos vase 
List of traditional Greek place names
 Mykonos Biennale

References

External links

 Official website of the Municipality of Mykonos
 Visit Mykonos information on Mykonos by Myconian community and Visitors

 
Populated places in Mykonos
Municipalities of the South Aegean
Mediterranean port cities and towns in Greece
Port cities of the Aegean Sea
Stato da Màr
Islands of Greece
Landforms of Mykonos
Islands of the South Aegean
Members of the Delian League
Greek city-states
Populated places in the ancient Aegean islands